Simon Cron is an Australian professional rugby union football coach. He is currently the head coach of the  team that plays in the Super Rugby competition. He was appointed Force coach ahead of the 2023 Super Rugby Pacific season in March 2022. Cron coached the Sydney Rays and the Australia U20s in his early coaching years, while also coaching Northern Suburbs. After a spell as  assistant coach, Cron moved to Japan to coach Toyota Verblitz., before returning to Australia to coach the Force.

References

External links
LinkedIn profile

Living people
Australian rugby union coaches
Year of birth missing (living people)